Grumello del Monte is a comune (municipality) of about 7,400 inhabitants in the province of Bergamo in the Italian region of Lombardy, located about  northeast of Milan and about  southeast of Bergamo.

Grumello del Monte borders the following municipalities: Carobbio degli Angeli, Castelli Calepio, Chiuduno, Gandosso, Palazzolo sull'Oglio, Telgate.

History 
The village's origins date from the Roman domination, as attested by the name, deriving from Latin grumus (hill). The castle was probably built in the 10th century AD.

Main sights 
 The medieval castle, turned into a residence by Bartolomeo Colleoni in the 14th century.
 Parish church (1720).
 Sanctuary of the Madonna del Buon Consiglio (15th century)
 Church of San Pantaleone.

Twin towns — sister cities
Grumello del Monte is twinned with:

  Eymet, France  
  Militello Rosmarino, Italy

References